Events in the year 1580 in Spain.

Incumbents 
Monarch: Philip II

Births 
June 26 - Gaspar de Borja y Velasco (died 1645)
 September 14 – Francisco de Quevedo, nobleman, politician and writer (died 1645)

References

 
Spain
Spain
1580s in Spain
Years of the 16th century in Spain